Legio XVIII ("Eighteenth Legion", spelled XVIII or XIIX) was a legion of the Imperial Roman army. It was founded ca. 41 BC by the future emperor Augustus. The legion was, along with Legio XVII and Legio XIX, destroyed in the Battle of Teutoburg Forest (September 9, 9 AD). The legion's symbol and cognomen are unknown.

This legion was probably created to deal with Sextus Pompeius, the last opponent of the second triumvirate, garrisoned in Sicily and threatening Rome's grain supply. It was probably one of the eight legions Augustus promised Mark Antony for his campaign against the Parthians, but never delivered.

Following the defeat of Antony and Cleopatra in the battle of Actium (31 BC), the legion was stationed in Gaul. In the end of the 1st century BC, the XVIIIth was sent to the Germania provinces in the Rhine to take part in the enormous army led by Drusus and later Tiberius. In 5, the provinces were pacified. In 7, Publius Quinctilius Varus was assigned governor.

On September 9, Arminius, leader of the Cheruscan allies, reported a rebellion in the Rhine area. Without suspecting the information received, Varus took his three legions, the XVIII along with XVII and XIX, and headed west. On 9 September, near modern Osnabrück, the Cheruscii led by Arminius ambushed the governor's army. All three legions were destroyed in what is known as the Battle of Teutoburg Forest and their eagle standards lost.

After their destruction, the Romans never used these legion numbers (XVII, XVIII and XIX) again.

Known members of the legion

See also 
List of Roman legions

References

External links 
 livius.org account of the eighteenth legion

18
40s BC establishments
1st-century BC establishments in the Roman Republic
9 disestablishments
Military units and formations established in the 1st century BC